Yumie Nishiogi (西荻 弓絵; born September 3, 1960) is a Japanese screenwriter.

References

External links
 www.allcinema.net
 www.weblio.jp
 

Japanese screenwriters
Living people
1960 births